The 2012–13 LSU Tigers basketball team represents Louisiana State University during the 2012–2013 college basketball season. The team's head coach is Johnny Jones, who is in his first season at LSU.  Jones previously served as the head coach at the University of North Texas. Jones played in the 1981 Final Four as a freshman at Louisiana State University, and later served 12 seasons as an assistant coach at LSU under Dale Brown where the pair returned the 1986 Final Four.  They play their home games at Pete Maravich Assembly Center as members of the Southeastern Conference.

Previous season 

The Tigers completed the 2011–2012 season with an overall record of 18-15 and a 7–9 record in conference play.  After falling to the eventual national champions, the Kentucky Wildcats, in the second round of the SEC tournament, LSU received a bid to the NIT tournament, where they were defeated by the Oregon Ducks in the first round.  LSU lost several major contributors at the end of the season, including 2nd team All-SEC center Justin Hamilton, who was selected 45th overall in the 2012 NBA Draft by the Philadelphia 76ers.

In April 2012, it was announced that after four seasons as head coach, Trent Johnson would be leaving LSU to become the head basketball coach at TCU.  Shortly after, LSU announced that it had hired Johnny Jones as its new head coach.  Jones played at LSU for four seasons from 1980 to 1984, including an appearance in the 1981 NCAA Final Four.  He followed his playing career by serving as an assistant coach under Dale Brown from 1984 to 1997.  Prior to becoming the head coach at LSU, Jones had spent the previous eleven seasons as the head coach at the University of North Texas, where he accumulated a record of 190-146 and earned two NCAA tournament bids.

Departures

Class of 2012 signees

Roster

Depth chart

Schedule

|-
!colspan=12| Non-Conference Regular Season

|-
!colspan=12| SEC Regular Season

|-
!colspan=12| 2013 SEC tournament

|-
| colspan="12" | *Non-Conference Game. Rankings from AP poll. All times are in Central Time.
|}

References

LSU Tigers basketball seasons
LSU Tigers
LSU
LSU